Hydroxyacetophenone may refer to:

 2-Hydroxyacetophenone (o-hydroxyacetophenone)
 3-Hydroxyacetophenone (m-hydroxyacetophenone)
 4-Hydroxyacetophenone (p-hydroxyacetophenone, piceol)